John Todd Ferrier (7 November 1855 — 31 August 1943) was the founder of the Order of the Cross, whose Aims and Ideals state that it is an informal spiritual fellowship, having for its service in life the cultivation of the Spirit of Love towards All Souls: helping the week and defending the defenseless and oppressed: abstaining from hurting the creatures eschewing bloodshed and flesh eating and living upon the pure foods so abundantly provided by Nature: walking in the Mystic Way of Life whose Path leads to the realisation of the Christhood and sending forth the Mystic Teachings unto all who may be able to receive them - those Sacred interpretations of the Soul, the Christhood and the Divine Love and Wisdom for which the Order of the Cross stands. 

He considered that fostering compassion towards creatures was a central part of realizing Jesushood within the soul. He was an advocate of vegetarianism from a Christian point of view.

History
Ferrier was born in Greenock, Scotland. Although biographical details are sparse, in 1947, E. Mary Gordon Kemmis wrote a biography and her memoirs of Ferrier: Shepherd of Souls: Some Impressions of the Life and Ministry of John Todd Ferrier. For some years he was a minister in the Congregational Church in Macclesfield, England. However, he became increasingly dissatisfied with the traditional Christian attitude toward animals. For this and other reasons he left the church, and, via the Order of the Golden Age, in 1904 founded the Order of the Cross.

In this informal spiritual communion, the members are both vegetarian or vegan and pacifist. He often spoke in defence of 'the creatures', and stated that a true Christian should be vegetarian. In his writings (over 40 volumes) he emphasised the underlying unity of all religious aspirations and suggested that many traditional Christian teachings are allegorical and universal in nature.

Ferrier authored a book, Concerning Human Carnivorism. It was reprinted as On Behalf of the Creatures in 1968. Ferrier argued that Jesus was a vegetarian who espoused Essene-like asceticism.

Selected bibliography 

The Mystery of the Light Within Us				
Life's Mysteries Unveiled
The Master, Known Unto the World As Jesus the Christ: His Life & Teachings		
Spiritual Healing
Isaiah: A Cosmic and Messianic Drama
The Minor Prophets		
Ezekiel: A Cosmic Drama
Logia: or Sayings of the Master (4th Revised edition)

Divine Renaissance
The Pathway to Peace
The Message and the Work
The Prophecy of Daniel
The Christ Festival		
On Behalf of the Creatures: a plea historical, scientific, economic, dynamic, humane, religious
What is a Christian
Sublime Affirmations

See also 
International Vegetarian Union

Notes

References

External links

The Anna Kingsford website.
John Todd Ferrier About the Author, orderofthecross.org 
Order of the Cross, top level of website orderofthecross.org- 'The Order of the Cross is a spiritual fellowship that embraces a life of love and light, compassion and peace. The sanctity of all life is honoured by members who are vegan or vegetarian and embrace the ideal of a pacifist way of life.' See also: 'The Order of the Cross was founded in 1904. The founder of this informal Fellowship, John Todd Ferrier, brought through a recovered Message of Love, Peace, Joy and Hope using the spoken and written word.'

1855 births
1943 deaths
19th-century Congregationalist ministers
20th-century Congregationalist ministers
Christian vegetarianism
People from Greenock
Scottish vegetarianism activists